The one-cent coin was a coin struck in the Kingdom of the Netherlands between 1817 and 1980.

Dimensions and weight

Versions

Gallery

Notes

References

External links

 Obverses and reverses

Guilder
Coins of the Netherlands
One-cent coins